Dekko is a San Francisco based company developing 3D mapping and augmented reality engine. Using a built in camera on smart phones or wearable devices (like Google Glass), Dekko's software digitally recreates a scene allowing apps and users to interact with their real world surroundings.

Founded in 2011 by Silka and Matt Miesnieks, Dekko has raised $3.2 million in early funding rounds. Their first game, Tabletop Speed, is an augmented reality race car game for iOS devices.

Dekko is currently working on augmented reality apps for Android and Google Glass.

References

External links 
https://techcrunch.com/2013/05/09/dekko-real-world-os/

Augmented reality
Companies established in 2011
Companies based in San Francisco
Map companies of the United States
Eyewear companies of the United States
Software companies of the United States